Detomidine is an imidazole derivative and α2-adrenergic agonist, used as a large animal sedative, primarily used in horses. It is usually available as the salt detomidine hydrochloride.  It is a prescription medication available to veterinarians sold under various trade names.

Currently, detomidine is licensed for use only in horses in the US but it is also licensed for use in cattle in Europe and Australasia.

Properties
Detomidine is a sedative with analgesic properties. α2-adrenergic agonists produce dose-dependent sedative and analgesic effects, mediated by activation of α2 catecholamine receptors, thus inducing a negative feedback response, reducing production of excitatory neurotransmitters. Due to inhibition of the sympathetic nervous system, detomidine also has cardiac and respiratory effects and an antidiuretic action.

Effects

A profound lethargy and characteristic lowering of the head with reduced sensitivity to environmental stimuli (sound, pain, etc.) are seen with detomidine. A short period of reduced coordination is characteristically followed by immobility and a firm stance with front legs spread.  Following administration there is an initial increase in blood pressure, followed by bradycardia and second degree atrioventricular block (this is not pathologic in horses). The horse commonly sweats to excess, especially on the flanks and neck. Other side effects reported include pilo erection (hair standing erect), ataxia, salivation, slight muscle tremors, and (rarely) penile prolapse.

Uses

Sedation and anaesthetic premedication in horses and other large animals, commonly combined with butorphanol for increased analgesia and depth of sedation. In conjunction with ketamine it may also be used for intravenous anaesthesia of short duration.

The drug is normally administered by the intravenous route, and is fastest and most efficient when given intravenously . However, in recalcitrant animals, detomidine may be administered by the intramuscular or sublingual routes. The dose range advised by the manufacturers is 20–40 µg/kg intravenous for moderate sedation, but this dose may need to be higher if given intramuscularly.

When given intravenously, detomidine usually takes effect in 2–5 minutes, and recovery is full within 30–60 minutes.  However, this is highly dependent upon the dosage, environment, and the individual animal; some horses are highly resistant to sedation.

Cautions

As detomidine is an arrhythmogenic agent, extreme care should be exercised in horses with cardiac disease, and in the concurrent administration of other arrhythmogenics. The concurrent use of potentiated sulfonamide antibiotics is considered particularly dangerous.

Anesthetic recoveries in horses that have received ketamine following a detomidine premedication are often violent with the horse having multiple failures to stand resulting in trauma to itself.  Xylazine is a superior premedication with ketamine resulting in safer recoveries.

See also 
 Medetomidine
 Dexmedetomidine

References

External links 

 
 

Alpha-2 adrenergic receptor agonists
Equine medications
Imidazoles
Sedatives